Junkee Media, formerly known as Sound Alliance, is a digital media company based in Australia. According to the company, Junkee Media's websites attract a monthly audience of over 2 million unique browsers. Nearly 70 per cent of the website's traffic comes from mobile devices and the biggest referrer to the network is Facebook.

History
Junkee Media was founded in 2000 when Matt Callander, Libby Clark and Andre Lackmann launched their dance music website inthemix. The website began as a part-time hobby for the three, who were soon joined by Neil Ackland. Ackland discovered the site online and got in touch with its creators.

Sound Alliance acquired Mess+Noise in October 2008 from failed media group Destra Corporation. Mess+Noise had been operating since 2005 when it began as a bimonthly print publication. In 2006, Tim Duggan co-founded national LGBT site Same Same with Sound Alliance.

Sound Alliance launched Junkee in March 2013, an online title aimed at an audience aged 18 to 29 years. The publisher told its audience that Junkee would be built on principles uncovered in a comprehensive youth survey of a few thousand 18- to 29-year-olds. Sound Alliance used Junkee to trial native advertising which by October 2014 it used across all of its publications.

Sound Alliance formally rebranded itself as Junkee Media in July 2015. CEO Neil Ackland told media the name change reflected the company's transformation from being a music-only publisher to becoming a youth-focused lifestyle publisher. In September 2015, Junkee Media sold LGBT title Same Same to Evo Media.

In 2016, oOh!media, a publicly listed Australian outdoor advertising company, bought 85% of Junkee Media for $11.05 million. It acquired the remaining 15% several years later.

In April 2017, FasterLouder was rebranded to Music Junkee, and a new site targeting Generation Z, Punkee, was launched the following month. In November 2018, Junkee Media closed down inthemix after 18 years.

In December 2021, Junkee Media was sold to RACAT Group. oOh!media retained Junkee’s branded content and production arm, Junkee Studio. Junkee Media CEO Neil Ackland remained at oOh!media and Piers Grove became head of Junkee Media.

Publications 
Junkee, a pop culture and political satire site
Punkee, an entertainment and pop culture site aimed at 16 to 24 year-olds
AWOL, a youth travel site produced in partnership with Qantas, founded in 2014

Awards
Junkee was named media brand of the year at the 2014 Mumbrella Awards. Qantas and Junkee Media's AWOL was named the content marketing strategy of the year in 2015.

In 2011, Sound Alliance was named to the Digital Media Top 10 Power Index, lauded for disrupting their larger traditional media competitors.

Sound Alliance was named one of Australia's best places to work in both 2010 and 2009 by the publication BRW.

Punkee was named the media brand of the year at the 2018 Mumbrella Awards. Junkee Media was named publishing company of the year - large publishers at the 2018 Publish Awards.

References

Publishing companies of Australia